Murray Smith (14 June 1940 – 28 December 2003) was a British television writer and producer. He was associated with many British films and TV shows, including the ITV series The XYY Man, Strangers and Bulman, all featuring actor Don Henderson in the role of George Bulman. Smith also wrote scripts for such series as The Sweeney, Minder, and Dempsey and Makepeace, and also wrote several novels.

He also wrote five screenplays for British exploitation director Pete Walker. These included Die Screaming, Marianne and The Comeback.

Filmography

Television

References

External links

1940 births
2003 deaths
British television writers
British television producers
20th-century screenwriters